"" (literally "A rose has sprung up") is a Christmas carol and Marian hymn of German origin. It is most commonly translated into English as "Lo, how a rose e'er blooming" and is also called "A Spotless Rose" and "Behold a Rose of Judah". The rose in the German text is a symbolic reference to the Virgin Mary. The hymn makes reference to the Old Testament prophecies of Isaiah, which in Christian interpretation foretell the Incarnation of Christ, and to the Tree of Jesse, a traditional symbol of the lineage of Jesus. Because of its prophetic theme, the hymn is popular during the Christian season of Advent.

The hymn has its roots in an unknown author before the 17th century. It first appeared in print in 1599 and has since been published with a varying number of verses and in several translations. It is most commonly sung to a melody harmonized by the German composer Michael Praetorius in 1609. The hymn's popularity endures in the 20th and 21st centuries.

Meaning

The hymn was originally written with two verses that describe the fulfilment of the prophecy of Isaiah foretelling the birth of Jesus. It emphasizes the royal genealogy of Jesus and Christian messianic prophecies. The hymn describes a rose sprouting from the stem of the Tree of Jesse, a symbolic device that depicts the descent of Jesus from Jesse of Bethlehem, the father of King David. The image was especially popular in medieval times, and it features in many works of religious art from the period. It has its origin in the Book of Isaiah:

The second verse of the hymn, written in the first person, then explains to the listener the meaning of this symbolism: That Mary, the mother of Jesus, is the rose that has sprung up to bring forth the Christ child, represented as a small flower ("das Blümlein"). The German text affirms that Mary is a "pure maiden" ("die reine Magd"), emphasizing the doctrine of the Virgin birth of Jesus. In Theodore Baker's 1894 English translation, on the other hand, the second verse indicates that the rose symbolizes the infant Christ.

Since the 19th century, other verses have been added, both in German and in translation.

History
The poetry of Isaiah's prophecy has featured in Christian hymns since at least the 8th century, when Cosmas the Melodist wrote a hymn about the Virgin Mary flowering from the Root of Jesse, "", translated in 1862 by John Mason Neale as "Rod of the Root of Jesse".

The text of "" dates from the 15th century. Its author is unknown. The hymn has been used by both Catholics and Protestants, with the focus of the song being Mary or Jesus, respectively. In addition, there have been numerous versions of the hymn, with varying texts and lengths. In 1844, the German hymnologist  added three more stanzas, the first of which, "", remained popular and has been included in Catholic and Protestant hymnals.

The tune generally used for the hymn originally appeared in the Speyer Hymnal (printed in Cologne in 1599), and the familiar harmonization was written by German composer Michael Praetorius in 1609. A canon version for four voices also exists, based on Praetorius's harmony and sometimes attributed to his contemporary, Melchior Vulpius. The metre of the hymn is 76.76.676.

In 1896, Johannes Brahms used the hymn's tune as the base for a chorale prelude for organ, one of his Eleven Chorale Preludes Op. 122, later transcribed for orchestra by Erich Leinsdorf.

During the Nazi era, many German Christmas carols were rewritten to promote National Socialist ideology and to excise references to the Jewish origins of Jesus. During Christmas in Nazi Germany, "" was rewritten as "" ("A light has arisen for us/on a dark winter night"), with a secularised text evoking sunlight falling on the Fatherland and extolling the virtues of motherhood.

The hymn's melody has been used by a number of composers, including Hugo Distler who used it as the base for his 1933 oratorio  (The Christmas Story). Arnold Schoenberg's Weihnachtsmusik (1921) for two violins, cello, piano and harmonium is a short fantasy on Es ist ein Ros entsprungen with Stille Nacht as a contrapuntal melody. In 1990, Jan Sandström wrote  for two a cappella choirs, which incorporates the setting of Praetorius in choir one.

English translations
Well-known versions of the hymn have been published in various English translations. Theodore Baker's "Lo, How a Rose E'er Blooming" was written in 1894 and appears in the Psalter Hymnal (Christian Reformed Church in North America) and The United Methodist Hymnal (American United Methodist Church).

The British hymn translator Catherine Winkworth translated the first two verses of the hymn as "A Spotless Rose". In 1919 the British composer Herbert Howells set this text as a motet for SATB choir. Howells stated that:

I sat down and wrote A Spotless Rose...after idly watching some shunting from the window of a cottage in Gloucester which overlooked the Midland Railway. In an upstairs room I looked out on iron railings and the main Bristol to Gloucester railway line, with shunting trucks bumping and banging. I wrote it and dedicated to my mother – it always moves me when I hear it, just as if it were written by someone else.

Howells' carol is through-composed, switching between 7/8, 5/4 and 5/8 time signatures, unconventional for a carol of this era. The plangent final cadence ("On a cold, cold winter's night"), with its multiple suspensions is particularly celebrated. Howells' contemporary, Patrick Hadley reportedly told the composer "I should like, when my time comes, to pass away with that magical cadence". Winkworth's translation was again set to music in 2002 by the British composer and academic Sir Philip Ledger.

A further English translation of the hymn, "Behold, a rose is growing", was written by the American Lutheran musician and writer, Harriet Reynolds Krauth Spaeth (1845–1925). Her four-verse version is often published with an additional 5th verse, translated by the American theologian John Caspar Mattes (1876–1948).

Another Christmas hymn, "A Great and Mighty Wonder", is set to the same tune as this carol and may sometimes be confused with it. It is, however, a hymn by St. Germanus, (Μέγα καὶ παράδοξον θαῦμα), translated from Greek to English by John M. Neale in 1862. Versions of the German lyrics have been mixed with Neale's translation of a Greek hymn in subsequent versions such as Percy Dearmer's version in the 1931 Songs of Praise collection and Carols for Choirs (1961).

Lyrics

Music

See also 

 Es ist ein Ros entsprungen (Sandström)
 List of Christmas carols

References

External links

 
 List of all verses in German, from The Hymns and Carols of Christmas
 Free sheet music of "Lo, How a Rose E'er Blooming" for SATB, Cantorion.org
 
 
 MP3 of Sissel Kyrkjebø singing at a 2005 Christmas concert in Moscow, Internet Archive

German-language Christmas carols
Christmas in Germany
Hymn tunes
Marian hymns
German Christian hymns
16th-century hymns in German
Lutheran hymns
Advent songs